Dongjin is a town of Gangnan District, in the eastern suburbs of Guigang, Guangxi, People's Republic of China, located  from downtown Guigang. , it has 18 villages under its administration.

See also
List of township-level divisions of Guangxi

References

Towns of Guangxi
Guigang